Stagmatoptera precaria is a species of praying mantis in the family Mantidae.

See also
List of mantis genera and species

References

precaria
Insects described in 1758
Taxa named by Carl Linnaeus